Hisham Kafarneh (born 20 May 1959) is a Syrian television actor and  voice actor.

Early life
Hisham Kafarneh is representative and the author and theater director holds a Bachelor of Arts from the Higher Institute of Dramatic Art in Damascus in 1982.

Career
He work in many Series Syria such as Acre Prison, The Last Man, The Curse of Clay, Last the Knights and others. He also works in Dubbing cartoon and anime such as Kaiketsu Zorro, Slam Dunk, Remi, Nobody's Girl, Dragon Quest: Dai no Daibōken and other.

References

1959 births
Living people
Syrian male television actors
Syrian male voice actors